Shigeo Homma (19 April 1904 – 3 November 1974) was a Japanese gymnast. He competed in three events at the 1932 Summer Olympics.

References

1904 births
1974 deaths
Japanese male artistic gymnasts
Olympic gymnasts of Japan
Gymnasts at the 1932 Summer Olympics
Place of birth missing